Emmanuel Delan Junior Latte Lath (born 1 January 1999) is an Ivorian professional footballer who plays as a forward for Swiss Super League club St. Gallen on loan from  club Atalanta.

Club career

Atalanta
After featuring for Atalanta's Primavera squad, Latte Lath was promoted to the senior side for the 2016–17 season. 

On 13 August 2016, he made his senior debut as a substitute in a 3–0 victory against Cremonese in the Coppa Italia, replacing Alejandro Gómez in the 77th minute. His second appearance of the competition came in late November in another 3–0 win for La Dea, this time against Serie A rivals Pescara. On 11 January 2017, the young Ivorian scored his first senior goal for Atalanta in a 3–2 Coppa Italia defeat to Juventus.

Loan to Pescara
Latte Lath joined newly-relegated Serie B side Pescara on a season-long loan.

Loan to Pistoiese
He joined Pistoiese on loan on 7 July 2018.

Loan to Carrarese
On 24 January 2019, he moved on another loan, to Carrarese.

Loan to Imolese
On 10 July 2019, he was loaned to Imolese.

Loan to Pro Patria
On 11 September 2020 he joined Pro Patria on loan.

Loan to SPAL
On 12 July 2021, he moved to Serie B club SPAL on a season-long loan.

Loan to St. Gallen
Latte Lath joined Swiss Super League club St. Gallen on a season-long loan on 2 July 2022.

Career statistics

References

1999 births
Living people
Footballers from Abidjan
Ivorian footballers
Association football forwards
Atalanta B.C. players
Delfino Pescara 1936 players
U.S. Pistoiese 1921 players
Carrarese Calcio players
Imolese Calcio 1919 players
Aurora Pro Patria 1919 players
S.P.A.L. players
FC St. Gallen players
Serie C players
Ivorian expatriate footballers
Expatriate footballers in Italy
Ivorian expatriate sportspeople in Italy
Expatriate footballers in Switzerland
Ivorian expatriate sportspeople in Switzerland